The Vittorazi Easy 100 Plus is an Italian aircraft engine, designed and produced by Vittorazi Motors of Morrovalle for use in paramotors.

Design and development
The Easy 100 Plus engine is a single-cylinder two-stroke,  displacement, air-cooled, gasoline engine design, with a poly V belt reduction drive with reduction ratios of 3.3:1 and 3.8:1. It employs capacitor discharge ignition and produces  at 9500 rpm, with a compression ratio of 10.0:1.

Specifications (Easy 100 Plus)

See also

References

External links

Vittorazi aircraft engines
Two-stroke aircraft piston engines
Air-cooled aircraft piston engines
2000s aircraft piston engines